"No More" is a song with music by Toots Camarata (also known as Tutti Camarata) and words by Bob Russell.  It is usually mentioned in connection with Billie Holiday, who recorded it on October 4, 1944. The song is sometimes listed as "(You Ain't Gonna Bother Me) No More".

According to one source, Holiday would refer to "No More" as one of her favorite songs.

Recording session
Billie Holiday, with Toots Camarata and his orchestra (Decca) New York City, October 4, 1944: with Russ Case (trumpet), Hymie Schertzer (alto saxophone), Jack Cressey (alto saxophone), Larry Binyon (tenor saxophone), Paul Ricci (tenor saxophone), Dave Bowman (piano), Carl Kress (guitar), Haig Stephens (bass), Johnny Blowers drums, Toots Camarata (conductor, arranger),  Billie Holiday vocal + 6 strings

Other notable vocal versions 
Other singers who have performed it include:
Dinah Washington – Dinah Jams (1954)
Abbey Lincoln – Abbey Lincoln's Affair (1956), Abbey Sings Billie (1989)
June Christy – Fair and Warmer! (1957)
Lorez Alexandria (1964)
Carmen McRae - for her album Alive! (1965).
Irene Kral – Better Than Anything (1963)
Mark Murphy (1973)
Jeri Southern – When Your Heart's on Fire (1957).
Madeleine Peyroux – Careless Love (2004)
Diana Ross – Blue (2006, recorded in 1971-1972)
Catherine Russell - Strictly Romancin' (2012)

References

External links
 Jazzstandards: Songs and Instrumentals (No More)

1944 songs
Songs with lyrics by Bob Russell (songwriter)
Billie Holiday songs